CYP4A22 (cytochrome P450, family 4, subfamily A, polypeptide 22) also known as fatty acid omega-hydroxylase is a protein which in humans is encoded by the CYP4A22 gene.

This gene encodes a member of the cytochrome P450 superfamily of enzymes. The cytochrome P450 proteins are monooxygenases which catalyze many reactions involved in drug metabolism and synthesis of cholesterol, steroids and other lipids. This gene is part of a cluster of cytochrome P450 genes on chromosome 1p33.

CYP4A22 was once considered, along with CYP4A11, CYP4F2, and CYP4F3, as active in metabolizing arachidonic acid to 20-hydroxyeicosatetraenoic acid (20-HETE) by an omega oxidation reaction with the predominant 20-HETE-synthesizing enzymes in humans being CYP4F2 followed by CYP4A11; 20-HETE regulates blood flow, vascularization, blood pressure, and kidney tubule absorption of ions in rodents and possibly humans.  However, human CYP4A22 is expressed at very low levels in few tissues and may not be a functional enzyme in regard to the metabolism of arachidonic acid to 20-HETE.

References

External links

Further reading